Demi Gabrielle Elizabeth Burnett is an American television personality. She received national recognition after appearing as a contestant on season 23 of The Bachelor, but she was eliminated by Colton Underwood during week 6 of the show. After being eliminated from the show, she appeared  on season six of Bachelor in Paradise in August 2019. She was also a guest star on season 15 of The Bachelorette. In 2021, Burnett returned to reality television for season seven of Bachelor in Paradise.  In 2022 Burnett signed on to be the co-host alongside celebrity real estate agent Ralph Nudi in the upcoming adventure travel series Nudi on the Beach filming a pilot on Captiva Island just prior to Hurricane Ian.   Nudi on the Beach is being represented by Buffalo 8 Productions based in Los Angeles and is in negotiations with several networks regarding distribution.

Personal life 
While Burnett was filming The Bachelor, her mother Tina was serving a prison sentence for conspiracy to commit bank fraud. During the first episode of Bachelor in Paradise, she revealed that she had been "casually dating a woman". The woman, Kristian Haggerty, made a surprise appearance and ended up joining the show to continue her relationship on screen with Burnett in Paradise. This would make the couple the franchise's first same-sex on air relationship. During the season finale, Burnett and Haggerty got engaged. In September 2019, she appeared on The Ellen DeGeneres Show, where she stated "she was afraid to come out not only on national television, but to people she knew in real life, too". In October 2019, Burnett and Kristian Haggerty ended their relationship. In January 2020, she appeared on episode three of season 24 of The Bachelor to host a group date for the contestants fighting to win over bachelor Peter Weber.

In February 2022, Burnett revealed she was diagnosed with autism spectrum disorder and prefers being referred to as “autistic".

Filmography

References 

Year of birth missing (living people)
American television personalities
Bachelor Nation contestants
LGBT people from Texas
Living people
People from Texas
Texas State University alumni
21st-century American LGBT people
People on the autism spectrum
Place of birth missing (living people)